Heraclius ( 575–641) was the Byzantine emperor from 610 to 641.

Heraclius may also refer to:
 Antipope Heraclius (fl. 309-310), antipope to Pope Eusebius
 Heraclius the Cynic (fl. 360s), Roman philosopher
 Heraclius (primicerius sacri cubiculi) (died 455), courtier of Emperor Valentinian III
 Heraclius of Edessa (d. 474). Byzantine general
 Heraclius, Bishop of Angoulême (d. 580)
 Heraclius the Elder (fl. 580s–610s), Armenian-born Byzantine general and exarch of Africa
 Heraclius Constantine (612–641), or Constantine III, Byzantine emperor in 641
 Heraclius, better known as Heraclonas (626–642), Byzantine emperor in 641
 Heraclius Constantine, better known as Constans II (630–668), Byzantine emperor from 641 to 668
 Heraclius (son of Constans II), Byzantine co-emperor from 659 to 681
 Heraclius (son of Constantine IV), Byzantine prince
 Heraclius (brother of Tiberius III) (fl. 698–705), Byzantine general
 Heraclius of Jerusalem (c. 1128–1190/1191), religious leader
 Heraclius I of Kakheti (1642–1709), Georgian king
 Heraclius II of Georgia (1720/1721–1798), Georgian king
 Heraclius Djabadary (1891 – 1937), Georgian classical composer

See also
 Heraclitus (disambiguation)